Easy (also released as Last Session) is the final album by American jazz guitarist Grant Green featuring performances recorded in 1978, a few months before his death, and released on the Versatile label.

Reception

The Allmusic review by awarded the album 3 stars.

Track listing
 "Easy" (Lionel Richie) - 7:57  
 "Just the Way You Are" (Billy Joel) - 7:11  
 "Wave" (Antônio Carlos Jobim) - 6:07  
 "Empanada" (Gene Dunlap, Mario E. Sprouse) - 12:19  
 "Nighttime in the Switching Yard" (Jorge Calderón, David Lindell) - 5:11  
 "Three Times a Lady" (Lionel Richie) - 7:07
Recorded in New York City on April 17–20, 1978

Personnel
Grant Green - guitar
Jon Faddis, Lew Soloff - trumpet, flugelhorn
Janice Robinson, Kiane Zawadi - trombone
Karen Joseph - piccolo, flute, alto flute
Hank Crawford - alto saxophone, baritone saxophone
Jorge Dalto - piano, electric piano
Mario E. Sprouse - electric piano (track 6)
Wayne Morrison - guitar, electric guitar
Buster Williams - bass, electric bass
Dough Wilson - drums
Shanimba - percussion
Unidentified strings

References 

Versatile Records albums
Grant Green albums
1978 albums